Galeano may refer to:
 David Galeano Olivera (born 1961), Paraguayan linguist, anthropologist, philologist, and educator
 Eduardo Galeano (1940–2015), Uruguayan journalist, writer and novelist
 Gloria Galeano Garcés (1958–2016), Colombian botanist and agronomist
 Leonel Galeano (born 1991), Argentine football player
 Maneco Galeano (1945–1980), Paraguayan musician
 Marcos Aurélio Galeano (born 1972), Brazilian football player
 Subcomandante Insurgente Galeano, previously known as Subcomandante Marcos 
 Juan Benítez Galeano (born 1953)
 Carlos Galeano (born 1950)
 Fermin Galeano (born 1975)
 José Jaime Galeano (1945–2021)
 Juan Daniel Galeano (born 1986)
 Luis Galeano

See also
 Galiano (disambiguation)
 Galliano (disambiguation)
 Gagliano (disambiguation)